Emmering is a community in the Upper Bavarian district of Ebersberg. It is a member of the administrative community (Verwaltungsgemeinschaft) of Aßling.

Geography
Emmering is located in the Munich region. It includes one traditional rural land unit – Gemarkung in German – also called Emmering.

History
Emmering belonged to the Rentamt of Munich and the Court of Swabia of the Electorate of Bavaria. In the course of administrative reform in Bavaria, the current community came into being with the community edict of 1818.

Population development

Politics
The community’s mayor (Bürgermeister) is Claudia Streu-Schütze (FWG Emmering).

The community’s tax revenue in 2018 was € 1,169,000, of which € 153,000 was from business taxes.

Coat of arms
Emmering’s arms might heraldically be described thus: In argent a chevron gules, above which two slanted hart’s antlers gules.

Economy and infrastructure
According to official statistics, there were a total of 617 employees subject to social security contributions in 2018. Of these, 42 worked in the municipality in manufacturing, 19 in trade, transport, hospitality and 64 in other economic sectors. There were no processing businesses (with 20 or more employees) and 7 businesses in contracting. Furthermore, in 2016, there were 50 agricultural businesses with a total productive land area of 1,331 ha (5.14 sq mi), of which 837 ha (3.23 sq mi) was meadowland.

Education
In 1999, the following institutions could be found in Emmering:
Kindergartens: 50 Kindergarten places with 50 children
Elementary school: branch of the elementary school in Aßling

References

Ebersberg (district)